The Africa Zone was the unique zone within Group 4 of the regional Davis Cup competition in 2021. The zone's competition was held in round robin format in Brazzaville, Republic of the Congo, from 21 to 26 June 2021.

Participating nations

Inactive nations

Draw
Date: 21–26 June 2021

Location: Complexe Sportif La Concorde, Brazzaville, Republic of the Congo (hard)

Format: Round-robin basis. Two pools of five teams. The winner of each pool will play-off against the runner-up of the opposite pool to determine which two nations are promoted to Africa Group III in 2022.

Seeding

 1Davis Cup Rankings as of 8 March 2021

Round Robin

Pool A

Pool B

Standings are determined by: 1. number of wins; 2. number of matches; 3. in two-team ties, head-to-head records; 4. in three-team ties, (a) percentage of sets won (head-to-head records if two teams remain tied), then (b) percentage of games won (head-to-head records if two teams remain tied), then (c) Davis Cup rankings.

Playoffs

Round Robin

Pool A

Namibia vs. Botswana

Angola vs. Congo

Botswana vs. Angola

Uganda vs. Congo

Namibia vs. Angola

Uganda vs. Botswana

Namibia vs. Congo

Uganda vs. Angola

Namibia vs. Uganda

Botswana vs. Congo

Pool B

Nigeria vs. Ivory Coast

Cameroon vs. Senegal

Cameroon vs. Ivory Coast

Gabon vs. Senegal

Nigeria vs. Senegal

Cameroon vs. Gabon

Nigeria vs. Gabon

Senegal vs. Ivory Coast

Nigeria vs. Cameroon

Gabon vs. Ivory Coast

Play-offs

Promotional play-offs

Namibia vs. Nigeria

Ivory Coast vs. Botswana

5th to 6th play-off

Angola vs. Cameroon

7th to 8th play-off

Uganda vs. Senegal

9th to 10th play-off

Congo vs. Gabon

References

External links
Official Website

Davis Cup Europe/Africa Zone
Africa Zone